The Airwave Ten is an Austrian single-place, paraglider that was designed by Bruce Goldsmith and produced by Airwave Gliders of Fulpmes. It is now out of production.

Design and development
It is named for its glide ratio if 10:1. The models are each named for their relative size.

Variants
Ten S
Small-sized model for lighter pilots.
Ten M
Mid-sized model for medium-weight pilots.
Ten L
Large-sized model for heavier pilots.

Specifications (Ten M)

References

Ten
Paragliders